Lucy Akello is a Ugandan social worker and politician, who served as the member of parliament for the Amuru District Women's Constituency in the 10th Parliament (2016 to 2021). She was elected back to the eleventh Parliament representing Amuru District under FDC political party. She is a member of the opposition Forum for Democratic Change (FDC), and she serves as the shadow minister for labour, gender and social development.

Background and education
Akello was born on 9 October 1980, in Lamogi sub-county, Amuru District, in the Northern Region of Uganda. Her father is John Obina, a lecturer at Kyambogo University.

Akello attended Olwal Ocaja Primary School, later she attended Lacor Primary School, Mary Immaculate Primary School Gulu and Kyambogo Primary School for her Primary Leaving Certificate. She then attended Iganga Secondary School for her O-Level studies and then to Uganda Martyrs' Secondary School Namugongo, where she completed her A-Level education. She was admitted to Makerere University, in Kampala, where she graduated in 2004, with a Bachelor of Arts in Social Science. Later, in 2011, she obtained a Master of Arts in Development studies, from Uganda Martyrs University in Nkozi, Wakiso District.

Work experience
In 2005, she was hired by Justice & Peace Commission (JPC), a local non-government organization within the Catholic Church that promotes peace and reconciliation in war-torn Northern Uganda. She worked there for ten years, beginning as a program officer, then as a program manager and from 2006 until 2014, as the executive director. Her focus was on human rights, land rights, women rights and children's rights.

Political career
In October 2014, Betty Bigombe, the Amuru District Women's member of parliament resigned to take up an appointment at the World Bank, in Washington, DC. A special election was organised to fill her seat in December 2014. Akello, running on the opposition FDC political party ticket, beat seven other candidates and won. During the 2016 parliamentary election, she ran successfully, again on the FDC ticket. She spoke 30 times during the first year of the 10th Parliament.

Family
Akello is a married mother.

See also
 Angelline Osegge
 Winnie Kiiza
 Joy Atim

References

External links
Website of the Parliament of Uganda
New Amuru MP joins Parliament
Justice and Peace Commission

Living people
1980 births
Acholi people
Makerere University alumni
People from Amuru District
Uganda Martyrs University alumni
Uganda Management Institute alumni
21st-century Ugandan women politicians
21st-century Ugandan politicians
People from Northern Region, Uganda
Members of the Parliament of Uganda
Forum for Democratic Change politicians
Women members of the Parliament of Uganda